Ricardo Adrian Silva (born 27 March 1977) is an Argentinian former football player.

External links
FUTBOLPLUS.COM Ver Tema - Re: Jugadores Perdidos
BDFA profile

1977 births
Living people
Argentine footballers
Perak F.C. players
Association football midfielders
Sportspeople from Avellaneda